Kichanovo is a rural locality (a village) in Kultayevskoye Rural Settlement, Permsky District, Perm Krai, Russia. The population was 432 as of 2010. There are 14 streets.

Geography 
Kichanovo is located 20 km southwest of Perm (the district's administrative centre) by road. Bolshoye Savino is the nearest rural locality.

References 

Rural localities in Permsky District